The BL 8-inch howitzer Mark I through to Mark V (1 to 5) were a British improvisation developed early in the First World War to provide heavy artillery. It used shortened and bored-out barrels from various redundant naval 6-inch guns.

It bore no relation to the later 8-inch howitzer of the First World War, the Vickers 8-inch Mark VI to VIII howitzers which succeeded it.

History
The weapon entered service in February 1915.

The Mark I–V had many relatively minor differences in the carriages and trails and Mk IV, Mk VI and QF Mk II 6-inch naval gun barrels were used. However, the ballistic characteristics, propellant charges and shells used were similar for all Mks I–V. They are easily identified by their short thick barrel and twin recoil buffers above the barrel.

Mks I–IV were no longer repaired from summer 1917 onwards.

Combat use

They were operated by siege batteries of the Royal Garrison Artillery (RGA). Holt caterpillar tractors were used to tow them into position.

Mks I–V were limited by a short range and high weight, being 4–5 tons heavier than the succeeding Mk VI which was designed as a howitzer and hence had a much lighter barrel.

The improvised nature of the design led to failures such as premature explosion and unreliability in action, and difficulties of maintenance in workshops. There were also early quality-control problems with British mass production of ammunition in 1915 and early 1916 : "the 8-inch fuses failed so often that the battlefield was littered with unexploded 8-inch shells".

Despite their shortcomings they were generally considered a success :
"They were monstrous things and extremely heavy, but the machinery of the guns was very simple and that's why they did so extremely well and didn't give nearly as much trouble as some of the more complicated guns that came to appear later on. One was the very first to be made and it was marked, 'Eight-inch Howitzer No. 1 Mark I' so we called that gun, 'The Original'. It was marvellously accurate". Second Lieutenant Montague Cleeve, 36th Siege Artillery Battery, Royal Garrison Artillery.

They remained in use on the Western Front throughout the First World War as Britain's need for heavy artillery increased and was never fully met by production of modern equipment.

Photo gallery

See also
BL 8-inch howitzer Mk VI – VIII British successor
List of howitzers

Weapons of comparable role, performance and era
21 cm Mörser 10 Approximate German equivalent

Notes

References

Bibliography
Dale Clarke, British Artillery 1914–1919. Heavy Artillery. Osprey Publishing, Oxford UK, 2005 
General Sir Martin Farndale, History of the Royal Regiment of Artillery. Western Front 1914–18. London: Royal Artillery Institution, 1986 
I.V. Hogg & L.F. Thurston, "British Artillery Weapons & Ammunition 1914–1918". London: Ian Allan, 1972.
Peter Hart, "The Somme". London: Cassell Military Paperbacks, 2006.

External links

 Video clips on YouTube:  
 8 inch Howitzer Marks I to V at Landships

World War I howitzers
World War I artillery of the United Kingdom
203 mm artillery